Brendan Bell may refer to:

 Brendan Bell (ice hockey) (born 1983), Canadian ice hockey defenceman
 Brendan Bell (politician) (born 1971), Canadian territorial level politician and former cabinet minister
 Brendan Bell (footballer) (1910–?), Scottish footballer
 Brendan Bell (Neighbours), fictional character from the Australian soap opera Neighbours